Polystomoides is a genus of flatworms belonging to the family Polystomatidae.

The species of this genus are found in Australia and Northern America.

Species:

Polystomoides australiensis 
Polystomoides brasiliensis 
Polystomoides coronatus 
Polystomoides fuquesi 
Polystomoides magdalenensis 
Polystomoides malayi 
Polystomoides megaovum 
Polystomoides nelsoni 
Polystomoides ocellatum 
Polystomoides oris
Polystomoides rohdei 
Polystomoides scottae 
Polystomoides scriptanus 
Polystomoides soredensis 
Polystomoides uruguayensis

References

Platyhelminthes